Agustín Argüelles (18 August 1776 in Ribadesella, Asturias – 26 March 1844 in Madrid) was a Spanish liberal politician. He served as the 81st and 94th president of the Congress of Deputies.

Biography 
He studied Law at the University of Oviedo and worked as secretary of the bishop of Barcelona. In 1809, he was appointed secretary of the patriotic Royal Junta of the Treasury and Legislation. He was a member of the Cortes of Cádiz and was selected for the Constitutional commission, playing thus a key role in the drafting of the Constitution of 1812. Siding with the liberal faction of the Parliament, he promoted freedom of the press, free-market and physiocracy, the abolishment of torture, the prosecution of slave trade and the abolishment of the jurisdictional power of manors. He showed a notable oratorial skill during the parliamentary debates.

When in 1814 the War of Independence finished and Ferdinand VII returned to Spain as absolute monarch, Argüelles was imprisoned in Ceuta and later in Alcudia (Majorca). After the Riego's coup d'état in 1820, he was appointed minister of the Interior and led the moderate wing of the liberal party. He resigned in 1821 and was elected member of the Parliament in 1822. After the absolutist reaction of 1823, he exiled to Britain and turned back in 1834, when Queen Regent Maria Christina signed the 'Estatuto Real'. He was elected member of the Parliament and also turned to his original progressive liberal positions back, giving support to Mendizábal cabinet of 1835 and his ecclesiastical confiscation policy. After the revolution of 1836, he was appointed member of the commission for composing the Constitution that was promulgated in 1837. Thanks to him and to Olózaga, the Constitution was progressive liberal but not so much as 1812's, as they hoped moderate liberals would accept it.

When Queen Regent Maria Christina resigned in 1840, the Parliament debated whether to appoint one or three regents, including Argüelles. Finally, General Espartero was elected as the only Regent, but Argüelles was appointed legal guardian of Queen Isabella II (although Maria Christina protested the decision from Paris) and president of the Parliament. He ceased to be legal tutor in 1843, when Espartero resigned as Regent and Parliament decided to declare come of age 13-year-old queen.

He was a freemason.

Legacy
The Argüelles neighborhood of Madrid is named after him, as is the Argüelles metro stop.

Writings
 with Olózaga, José: De 1820 a 1824: reseña histórica, Madrid: A. de San Martín, 1864
Discurso preliminar de la Constitución de 1812, Madrid: Centro de Estudios Constitucionales, 1989
Examen histórico de la reforma constitucional de España, Oviedo: Junta General del Principado de Asturias, 1999
La reforma constitucional de Cádiz (annoted by Jesús Longares), Madrid: Iter, 1970

External links

 Parliamentary speeches during the Cortes of Cádiz

Bibliography

Ramos Argüelles, Antonio: Agustín Argüelles (1776-1844), "Padre del constitucionalismo español", Madrid: Atlas, 1991

1776 births
1844 deaths
People from Ribadesella
University of Oviedo alumni
Spanish Freemasons
Presidents of the Congress of Deputies (Spain)